Pålänge is a locality situated in Kalix Municipality, Norrbotten County, Sweden with 278 inhabitants in 2010.

Activities & Wildlife 
In Pålänge the "Kojan på Berget" is a cabin at the center in nature that was built around the 1970s on the mountain "Degerberget" that now is free to use for everyone and can be visited year round. The village is also surrounded by nature that makes it very beautiful because most of the countryside is untouched, which also makes it perfect for nature photographers to capture beautiful photographs.

The village also offers numerous activities even for those who do not come from Pålänge and wants to stay can stay at Country & Beach where even those have a range of activities in nature for those who want to familiarise themselves with the Norrlänska forest.

References 

Populated places in Kalix Municipality
Norrbotten